3-Aminoisobutyric acid (also known as β-aminoisobutyric acid or BAIBA) is a product formed by the catabolism of thymine.

During exercise, the increase of PGC-1α protein triggers the secretion of BAIBA from exercising muscles to blood (concentration 2 to 3 μM in human serum). When BAIBA reaches the white fat tissue, it activates the expression of thermogenic genes via PPARα receptors, resulting in a browning of white fat cells. One of the consequences of the BAIBA activity is the increase of the background metabolism of the BAIBA target cells.

It is thought to play a number of roles in cell metabolism, how body burns fat and regulates insulin, triglycerides, and total cholesterol.

BAIBA is found as a normal metabolite of skeletal muscle in 2014. The plasma concentrations are increased in human by exercise. The production is likely a result of enhanced mitochondrial activity as the increase is also observed in the muscle of PGC-1a overexpression mice. BAIBA is proposed as protective factor against metabolic disorder since it can induce brown fat function.

See also 
 β-Alanine
 beta-Hydroxy beta-methylbutyric acid
 GABA
 MB-3 (drug)

References 

Amino acids